Dražen Petrović Award is an award established in 2006 by the Croatian Olympic Committee. Awarded to talented young athletes and teams for outstanding sporting results and sports development. The award was named after Dražen Petrović.

Recipients

References

Croatian awards
Awards established in 2006
Sport in Croatia